The Thorndike Theatre is a Grade II listed building in Leatherhead, Surrey, England.  Roderick Ham designed the theatre within the shell of the disused 1930s Crescent Cinema. Named after Dame Sybil Thorndike, the theatre was opened on 17 September 1969 by Princess Margaret.

The theatre closed in 1997 after the loss of public funding. A charitable trust was set up to operate it and the theatre re-opened as the Leatherhead Theatre in 2001, with seating reduced to 495 plus three wheelchair places.

External links

References

Theatre companies in England
Theatres in Surrey
Grade II listed buildings in Surrey